Gonionota is a moth genus of the family Depressariidae.

Species
 Gonionota acrocosma (Meyrick, 1912)
 Gonionota aethographa Clarke, 1971
 Gonionota aethoptera Clarke, 1971
 Gonionota amauroptera Clarke, 1971
 Gonionota amphicrena (Meyrick, 1912)
 Gonionota anelicta (Meyrick, 1926)
 Gonionota anisodes (Meyrick, 1916)
 Gonionota argopleura Clarke, 1971
 Gonionota autocrena (Meyrick, 1930)
 Gonionota bourquini Clarke, 1964
 Gonionota bourquiniella (Köhler, 1939)
 Gonionota captans (Meyrick, 1931)
 Gonionota citronota (Meyrick, 1932)
 Gonionota cologramma Clarke, 1971
 Gonionota comastis Meyrick, 1909
 Gonionota confinella (Felder & Rogenhofer, 1875)
 Gonionota constellata (Meyrick, 1912)
 Gonionota contrasta Clarke, 1964
 Gonionota cristata Walsingham, 1912
 Gonionota cyanaspis (Meyrick, 1909)
 Gonionota determinata Clarke, 1964
 Gonionota dissita Clarke, 1964
 Gonionota dryodesma (Meyrick, 1916)
 Gonionota eremia Clarke, 1971
 Gonionota erotopis (Meyrick, 1926)
 Gonionota erythroleuca (Meyrick, 1928)
 Gonionota eurydryas (Meyrick, 1926)
 Gonionota euthyrsa (Meyrick, 1930)
 Gonionota excavata Clarke, 1964
 Gonionota extima Clarke, 1964
 Gonionota festicola (Meyrick, 1924)
 Gonionota fimbriata Clarke, 1964
 Gonionota gaiophanes Clarke, 1971
 Gonionota habristis (Meyrick, 1914)
 Gonionota hemiglypta Clarke, 1971
 Gonionota hydrogramma (Meyrick, 1912)
 Gonionota hypoleuca Clarke, 1971
 Gonionota hyptiotes Clarke, 1964
 Gonionota incalescens (Meyrick, 1914)
 Gonionota incisa Meyrick, 1909
 Gonionota incontigua Clarke, 1964
 Gonionota insignata Clarke, 1971
 Gonionota insulana Clarke, 1968
 Gonionota intonans (Meyrick, 1933)
 Gonionota ioleuca (Meyrick, 1912)
 Gonionota isastra (Meyrick, 1926)
 Gonionota isodryas (Meyrick, 1921)
 Gonionota isophylla Meyrick, 1909
 Gonionota lecithitis (Meyrick, 1912)
 Gonionota leucoporpa (Meyrick, 1926)
 Gonionota lichenista (Meyrick, 1926)
 Gonionota luteola (Felder & Rogenhofer, 1875)
 Gonionota melobaphes Walsingham, 1912
 Gonionota menura Clarke, 1971
 Gonionota militaris (Meyrick, 1914)
 Gonionota mimulina (Butler, 1883)
 Gonionota mitis (Meyrick, 1914)
 Gonionota notodontella (Zeller, 1877)
 Gonionota oligarcha (Meyrick, 1913)
 Gonionota oriphanta (Meyrick, 1928)
 Gonionota oxybela Clarke, 1971
 Gonionota paravexillata Clarke, 1971
 Gonionota periphereia Clarke, 1964
 Gonionota persistis (Meyrick, 1914)
 Gonionota phocodes Meyrick, 1909
 Gonionota phthiochroma Clarke, 1971
 Gonionota pialea (Meyrick, 1921)
 Gonionota poecilia Clarke, 1971
 Gonionota praeclivis (Meyrick, 1921)
 Gonionota prolectans (Meyrick, 1926)
 Gonionota pyrocausta (Meyrick, 1931)
 Gonionota pyrrhotrota (Meyrick, 1932)
 Gonionota rhacina (Walsingham, 1912)
 Gonionota rosacea (Forbes, 1931)
 Gonionota satrapis (Meyrick, 1914)
 Gonionota saulopis Meyrick, 1909
 Gonionota selene Clarke, 1971
 Gonionota sphenogramma Clarke, 1971
 Gonionota teganitis Meyrick, 1909
 Gonionota tenebralis (Hampson, 1906)
 Gonionota transversa Clarke, 1971
 Gonionota uberrima (Meyrick, 1914)
 Gonionota ustimacula (Zeller, 1874)
 Gonionota vexillata (Meyrick, 1913)
 Gonionota vivida (Meyrick, 1926)

References

 
Moth genera